Luis Calderón is the name of:

Luis Calderón (Colombian footballer) (born 1990), Colombian footballer
Luis Calderón (Peruvian footballer) (1929–2022), Peruvian footballer